Babur and Bura people also known as Pabir are part of the ethnic groups in Nigeria. They are located in Biu, Hawul, Kwaya Kusar, Shani and Bayo of Borno State. They can also be found in Garkida, Gombi local government of Adamawa State.

Origin 
The origin of  Babur and Bura people can be traced to the migrants from Yemen through Sudan and the Chad Basin to the present Babur Bura location, Northeastern part of Nigeria. However, in the mid-16th century Yamta-ra-Wala defeated the Bura people and established Biu kingdom. Due to the intermarriage between Yamta Wala's people and the Bura people, a new breed of ethnic group called Pabir or Babur (in Hausa) was created and till today, Babur and Buras' culture are very similar to the extent that they are regarded as one.

Traditional ruler 
The traditional ruler of Babur and Bura people is called an emir. Since they are the major occupants of Biu Kingdom, their current ruler is Mai Mustapha Umar Mustapha II, the Emir of Biu Kingdom.

Marriage culture 
Bura people have a distinct marriage system. When a girl child is born, the interested suitor signify his intention by presenting a leafy branch of tree into the mother's hut. If accepted, it is expected of him to keep on bringing gifts for the family, assisting the father in law with his farm and other things till the child become of age. Then, he has the right to employ the help of his friend to capture the wife and send her to his house before the bride price and other traditional items are provided.

Language 
Bura people are one of the speakers of Afro-Asiatic language of the Chadic group. They speak Bura Language and also have affinity with Hausa and Kanuri, Chibok.

Religion 
The Bura people are animists before the advent of Islam and Christianity in the 1920's. Their gods were represented by water, Iron, Stones, Forests etc. This traditional religion is called Hyel or Hyel- taku and Naptu is a personal god who takes cares of the people.

References 

Ethnic groups in Nigeria
Borno State
Adamawa State